Karin Marie Muraszko is Julian T. Hoff Professor and chair of the Department of Neurosurgery at the University of Michigan. She is the first woman to head a neurosurgery department at any medical school in the US.
She specializes in brain and spinal cord abnormalities. She has a spinal cord abnormality, spina bifida.

Early life and education 
She was born on in Jersey City, New Jersey and learned to read at age five. She graduated with a B.S. at Yale University in 1977 with a major in history and biology. Muraszko obtained her medical degree from Columbia University College of Physicians and Surgeons in 1981. She initially intended to specialize in psychiatry but switched to neurological surgery in her third year.

She was the first neurosurgery resident with a physical disability at Columbia Presbyterian Medical Center where the chairman of the neurological surgery department described her as "...the most outstanding person I've met in medicine" and further "...her intelligence, tenacity and motivation have enabled her to make a remarkable contribution to the care of our patients". She completed her residency in 1988.

Career 
From 1988 to 1990 Muraszko worked as a Senior Staff Fellow at the National Institutes of Health-NINDS. She moved to the University of Michigan in 1990 where she headed the pediatric neurosurgery service from 1995. In 2005 she became Chair of the Department of Neurosurgery. She is the first woman to Chair a Neurosurgery Department in the United States.

Muraszko is a specialist in pediatric neurosurgery. Her main interests are treating brain tumors, Chiari malformations, congenital spinal and brain abnormalities and complex craniofacial anomalies.

Muraszko is the first woman to serve as director of the American Board of Neurological Surgery.

Muraszko serves on the Physician's Advisory Committee of the Spina Bifida Association of America and the March of Dimes. She is the medical director of "Project Shunt", the neurosurgery component of an annual medical mission by the Michigan, Ohio, chapter of the medical charity "Healing the Children" to Guatemala, which has one of the highest incidences of spina bifida in the world. Muraszko was elected as the first woman to be President of the Society of Neurological Surgeons during the SNS Centennial celebration year.  She is a founding member of Women in Neurosurgery.

Selected articles

Awards and honors
 In 2005 the Association of Women Surgeons awarded her the Nina Starr Braunwald Award "in recognition of outstanding contributions to the advancement of women in surgery".
 In 2014 Muraszko received the Inspirational Physician Award from the American Medical Association's Women Physicians Section.
 Muraszko received the Congress of Neurological Surgeons Distinguished Service Award in 2015.
 Awarded the American Association of Neurological Surgeons Humanitarian Award in 2016.

Personal life 
She is married to Scott Van Sweringen, an architect; they have twin children. She lives in Ann Arbor, Michigan.

References

External links 
 

American medical academics
Living people
American people with disabilities
American neurosurgeons
People with spina bifida
University of Michigan faculty
People from Jersey City, New Jersey
Yale University alumni
Columbia University Vagelos College of Physicians and Surgeons alumni
1955 births
Scientists with disabilities